James Calhoun may refer to:

James Calhoun (politician, born 1743) (1743–1816), American politician, first mayor of Baltimore, Maryland
James Calhoun (politician, born 1802) (1802–1852), American politician, first governor of the Territory of New Mexico
James Calhoun (Atlanta politician) (1811–1875), American politician, sixteenth mayor of Atlanta, Georgia
James Calhoun (soldier) (1845–1876), American soldier killed at the Battle of Little Big Horn
Jim Calhoun (born 1942), American college basketball coach